Paris Musées is a public institution that has incorporated in the same entity the 14 City of Paris Museums plus staff in charge of management, collection monitoring and production of exhibitions, events and editions, bringing together about 1000 employees. The headquarters are at the following address: 27 rue des Petites Ecuries, 75 010 Paris.

The City of Paris Museums are :
 Musée d'Art Moderne de la Ville de Paris
 Maison de Balzac 
 Musée Bourdelle
 Carnavalet Museum History of Paris
 The Catacombs 
 Musée Cernuschi  Museum of Asian Art
 Musée Cognacq-Jay
 Archaeological Crypt of Notre-Dame
 Musée Galliera
 Museum of the General Leclerc and the Paris’ Liberation – Jean Moulin Museum
 Petit Palais  City of Paris Museum of Fine Arts
 Musée de la Vie Romantique
 Maison de Victor Hugo Paris / Guernsey
 Zadkine Museum

Mission statement
The public institution Paris Musées main mission is to manage the museums attached to it and allow them and their directors to run their scientific and cultural projects. 
The headquarters staff’s responsibility is to make sure the global cultural program is coherent and that priorities and goals fixed by the City of Paris are achieved, especially the ones concerning temporary exhibitions, catalogues and other cultural editions, educational and cultural programs.

History
Before 1 January 2013, museums were managed directly by the City of Paris, with a contractor, former company “Paris Musées”, in charge of the production of exhibitions and catalogues.

Therefore, Paris Musées was alternately a non-profit organization created in 1985, then a limited company and public contractor 28 February 2008 and since 1 January 2013, Paris Musées is a public institution: “établissement public local, à caractère administratif”.

Goals of the reform
This reform was decided by the mayor of Paris, Bertrand Delanoë, to promote and enhance the City of Paris Museums network.

The legal and financial autonomy given by the new entity, independent from the City of Paris’ administration, will facilitate management and responsiveness, as was the case for the major national museums. Keeping all museums in a single entity maintains the uniqueness of the municipal collection and enables the input of a more coherent strategy, therefore allowing economies of scale and better interactions between museums.

Missions
Priorities fixed by the City of Paris:

 Develop and highlight the museums’ collections. Through their computerization and digitization, research, programming of various events and exhibitions meant to make the municipal collections more known. Access to the City of Paris Museums’ collections is free since 2001.
 Produce high quality exhibitions and publications, contributing the Paris cultural wealth and influence, nationally and internationally
 Develop and expand audience through reinforced educational policies and major focus on visit comfort and visitors programs. Today, the City of Paris’ Museums have more than 2 million visitors each year. They would like to strengthen those figures while contributing in making culture more accessible to all visitors.

Board of directors and executive office
The public institution Paris Musées was created at the “Conseil de Paris” on the 20 June 2012 session. Its first board meeting took place 12 July 2012. Its chairman is Anne Hidalgo, first deputy mayor. Danièle Pourtaud, deputy mayor for heritage is vice chairman.

The Board of Directors counts nine Paris counseling members:
 Geneviève Bertrand
 Boulay-Esperonnier
 Danielle Fournier
 Christophe Girard
 Bruno Julliard
 Hélène Mace De Lepinay
 Danielle Simonnet

The Board also counts four qualified and renowned members:
 Martin Bethenod, director of the Palazzo Grassi in Venice
 Jean-François Chougnet, director of Marseille-Provence 2013
 Gaïta Leboissetier, deputy director, in charge of education at the National Superior School of Fine Arts
 Antoinette Le Normand-Romain, executive director at the National Institute of Art History

Delphine Levy, who conducted the reform’s project, was designated chief executive director.

See also

References

External links 

 
 Museum of Modern Art website
 Bourdelle Museum website
 Carnavalet Museum website
 Catacombs website
 Cernuschi Museum website
 Archaeological Crypt website
 Petit Palais website

 
 
Art museums and galleries in Paris